Pyrausta flavibrunnealis is a moth in the family Crambidae. It is found in Brazil (Bahia).

References

Moths described in 1908
flavibrunnealis
Moths of South America